Patrick Lance Borders (born May 14, 1963) is an American former professional baseball player and current minor league manager. He was the Most Valuable Player of the 1992 World Series as a member of the Toronto Blue Jays. Borders also won an Olympic gold medal with the United States baseball team at the 2000 Summer Olympics in Sydney. He is the current manager of the Williamsport Crosscutters of the New York–Penn League.

Early years
Borders was born in Columbus, Ohio, but spent the majority of his childhood in Lake Wales, Florida, where he currently resides. He attended Lake Wales High School and was a standout in both football and baseball. He batted .440 as a junior, and as a senior he batted .510 with a school single season record 10 home runs and 36 RBI. Although he was offered a football/baseball scholarship to Mississippi State University, he turned it down to sign with the Blue Jays, who had drafted him in the sixth round of the 1982 Major League Baseball Draft.

Professional career
Initially playing first and third base, he was converted to a catcher as his defense was deemed not strong enough to keep him in the majors. Over the next few seasons, he earned the full-time position behind the plate, and he was a cornerpiece of the 1992 and 1993 World Series champion teams. In the 1992 Series, he hit .450 with one home run en route to winning the World Series MVP award. On September 2, 1990, while with the Blue Jays, Borders caught Dave Stieb's no-hitter—the only one in franchise history to date.

Borders left the Jays as a free agent after the  season, but never found a permanent home like Toronto had been for him in his seven years there. Over the following decade he played for the Kansas City Royals, Houston Astros (1995), St. Louis Cardinals, California Angels (1996), Chicago White Sox (1996), Cleveland Indians (-), returned to Toronto in 1999, Seattle Mariners (-), Minnesota Twins (2004), and again with the Mariners, never playing in more than 55 games for any one team during a season.

Borders was signed by the Milwaukee Brewers to a minor league contract after the 2004 season. On May 19, 2005, he was acquired by Seattle from the Brewers for cash considerations and was assigned to Triple-A Tacoma of the Pacific Coast League. With Seattle's primary catcher Miguel Olivo struggling, and losing backup catcher Dan Wilson to an injury, Borders became Seattle's primary catcher for most of the first half of the 2005 season. Seattle designated him for assignment shortly after the All-Star Break to make room for some younger prospects. During his time in Triple-A Tacoma for the Mariners, Borders stated that he would rather remain in Triple-A, because he was closer to his family, enjoyed the lifestyle, and had enough money.

On January 25, the Los Angeles Dodgers signed Borders to a minor league contract and invited him to spring training. On May 27, he announced his retirement. Borders finished his career with a .253 batting average, 69 home runs, and 346 runs batted in in 1,099 games.

Borders is one of only five players to have won both a World Series championship and an Olympic gold medal, along with Doug Mientkiewicz and Cuban players Orlando Hernandez, Jose Contreras and Yuli Gurriel.

Post-retirement
On August 7, 2009, the Blue Jays held a pre-game ceremony at the Rogers Centre recognizing members of the 1992 and 1993 World Series teams, including Borders. As part of the event, Borders caught the ceremonial first pitch from Cito Gaston, then in his second stint as Blue Jays manager after leading the team to both Series titles.

In June 2015, Borders began his first season as manager of the Williamsport Crosscutters, the Philadelphia Phillies’ short-season single A affiliate.

See also
 List of Olympic Games gold medalists who won World Series

References

External links
 , or Retrosheet
 Pelota Binaria (Venezuelan Winter League)
 
 
 

1963 births
Living people
American expatriate baseball players in Canada
Baseball coaches from Florida
Baseball players at the 2000 Summer Olympics
Baseball players from Florida
Buffalo Bisons (minor league) players
Caimanes del Sur players
American expatriate baseball players in the Dominican Republic
California Angels players
Cardenales de Lara players
American expatriate baseball players in Venezuela
Chicago White Sox players
Cleveland Indians players
Dunedin Blue Jays players
Durham Bulls players
Florence Blue Jays players
Houston Astros players
Kansas City Royals players
Kinston Blue Jays players
Kinston Eagles players
Knoxville Blue Jays players
Las Vegas 51s players
Major League Baseball catchers
Medalists at the 2000 Summer Olympics
Medicine Hat Blue Jays players
Minnesota Twins players
Minor league baseball coaches
Minor league baseball managers
Nashville Sounds players
Olympic gold medalists for the United States in baseball
People from Lake Wales, Florida
People from Scioto County, Ohio
Seattle Mariners players
Baseball players from Columbus, Ohio
Baseball coaches from Ohio
St. Louis Cardinals players
Syracuse Chiefs players
Tacoma Rainiers players
Toronto Blue Jays players
Vero Beach Dodgers players
World Series Most Valuable Player Award winners